Shigematsu is a Japanese name. It may refer to:

People

Surname
, football player
, Japanese writer
, Japanese long-distance runner
, Japanese former figure skater
, Japanese priest
, Japanese manga artist
 Tetsuro Shigematsu (born 1971), radio broadcaster
, Japanese football player

Given name
, Japanese admiral in the Imperial Japanese Navy 

Japanese-language surnames
Japanese masculine given names